Cantrainea macleani is a species of sea snail, a marine gastropod mollusk in the family Colloniidae.

Description
The shell grows to a height of 17 mm.

Distribution
This species occurs in the Gulf of Mexico off Southeast USA.

References

 Warèn, A. & Bouchet, P., 1993. New records, species, genera, and a new family of gastropods from hydrothermal vents and hydrocarbon seeps. Zoologica Scripta 22(1): 1-90

External links
 

Colloniidae
Gastropods described in 1993